Capua aeluropa is a species of moth of the family Tortricidae. It is found on Borneo and in New Guinea.

References

Moths described in 1926
Capua (moth)